Asociación de Atletismo del Alto Paraná initialed AAAP is a track and field athletics club based in the city of Ciudad del Este in Paraguay. The club is affiliated with the Federación Paraguaya de Atletismo. The majority of the club's participations and achievements are for Marathon and Long distance running. The AAAP also organizes many marathon events within Ciudad del Este and Hernandarias, and also competes in marathons in neighbor city Foz de Iguazu in Brazil. At national level, the Asociación de Atletismo del Alto Paraná is the best athletics club in Paraguay along with Club Sol de América and Paraguay Marathon Club.

History

2016 demonstrated to be a successful year for athletes of the AAAP. Marathon runner Pedro Garay represented the country in two encounters: the 2016 South American Marathon Championships and the 2016 South American Half Marathon Championships.

In the Peace of the Chaco Cup, disputed in Paraguarí, Garay also finished in first place of the 5000 meters event with a marc of 17.32.9 whilst Arturo Abel Aguilar Oviedo achieved first position in the events of 800 meters and 400 meters, respectively.

In the third round of the Competition of the Family the AAAP was champion in the mayor category of masculine with 231 points, very far a head of Villarrica Running Club (VRC) with 94 points, Club de Atletismo de Carapeguá (CAC) 91 points and Club of Athletics of Paraguarí (CAP) with 75 points. Also, the general champion of the Competition of the Family was the AAAP with 254 points.

In 2016, the AAAP was the host of a national athletics championship of the Paraguayan Athletics Federation, disputed in November 2016. In the organization of the competition, the AAAP received support from ex javelin thrower and South American record holder Edgar Baumann, who is a resident of Ciudad del Este, the same city that the AAAP finds itself in.

International

National

Honours
 2016 – General Champion of the Competition of the Family Inter Club with 254 points.
 2015 National Cross Country Championships: 2nd Place

See also
List of athletics clubs in Paraguay

References

External links
 Official Facebook Page

Athletics clubs in Paraguay
Ciudad del Este